is a Japanese voice actor and singer. He is a known member of Pro-Fit and SparQlew. He won the Best New Actor Award at the 12th Seiyu Awards.

Filmography

Anime television series
2016
Age 12: A Little Heart-Pounding, Kazuma Hiyama
Aikatsu Stars!, Asahi Kasumi
Phantasy Star Online 2: The Animation, Seiya Urisaka
Soul Buster, Cao Xing (Sō Sei)
The Lost Village, Jigoku no Gōka
Digimon Universe: Appli Monsters, Navimon

2017
Altair: A Record of Battles, Ahmet
Atom: The Beginning, AI, Lab 6 research student, Robot B, Voice A
Chaos;Child, Matsuki Kazuya
Fastest Finger First, Shiki Koshiyama
Hell Girl: Fourth Twilight, Toshio Mikami
Juni Taisen, Tsugiyoshi Sumino (Nezumi)/Rat
PriPri Chi-chan!!, Yamato Suō
The Idolmaster SideM (2017), Pierre

2018
Angolmois: Record of Mongol Invasion, Amushi
Death March to the Parallel World Rhapsody, Ichirō Suzuki / Satou Pendragon

2019
After School Dice Club, Ryūji Yoshioka
Bakugan: Battle Planet, Trox, Kurin
My Roommate Is a Cat, Hiroto Yasaka
Namu Amida Butsu!: Rendai Utena, Fugen Bosatsu
Sarazanmai, Enta Jinnai
The King of Fighters for Girls, Bao
The Seven Deadly Sins (manga), Sariel
Try Knights, Rinto Arimura

2020
Akudama Drive, Hacker
Bakugan: Armored Alliance, Trox, Kurin
King's Raid: Successors of the Will, Theo
Rent-A-Girlfriend, Kazuya Kinoshita
Shachibato! President, It's Time for Battle!, Minato
Tomica Kizuna Gattai Earth Granner, Joe Pachero

2021
2.43: Seiin High School Boys Volleyball Team, Tomoki Kakegawa
D_Cide Traumerei the Animation, Aruto Fushibe
Dragon Goes House-Hunting, Letty
Dragon Quest: The Adventure of Dai, Chiu
Everything for Demon King Evelogia, Eve/Evelogia
So I'm a Spider, So What?, Schlain Zagan Analeit / Shunsuke Yamada
Visual Prison, Robin Laffite
World Trigger Season 2, Kai Minamisawa

2022
Aoashi, Kanpei Kuroda
Arknights: Prelude To Dawn, Faust (Sasha)
Eternal Boys, Sakura Kagurazaka
In the Land of Leadale, Quolkeh
Phantom of the Idol, Kazuki Yoshino
Rent-A-Girlfriend Season 2, Kazuya Kinoshita
Salaryman's Club, Shuhei Nakamura
Spy × Family, George Glooman (ep.19)
Tribe Nine, Haru Shirogane
VazzRock the Animation, Yuma

2023
Endo and Kobayashi Live! The Latest on Tsundere Villainess Lieselotte, Fabian Oldenburg
High Card, Leo Constantine Pinochle
The Dangers in My Heart, Kyotaro Ichikawa
 Pokémon, Amejio 

2024
Shaman King: Flowers, Yohane Asakura

TBA
Migi to Dali, Migi

Anime films
Kaze no Matasaburo (2016), Pekichi
Aikatsu Stars! The Movie (2016), Asahi Kasumi
Fate/Grand Order: Moonlight/Lostroom (2017), Galahad
Love Me, Love Me Not (2020)

OVA
Black Clover (2017), Asta

Web Anime
Whistle! (2016), Shō Kazamatsuri
Chōyū Sekai: Being the Reality (2017), Noii
MILGRAM, Haruka Sakurai

Dubbing
Live-action
The Undoing, Henry Fraser (Noah Jupe)
Animation
The Addams Family, Pugsley Addams
The Addams Family 2, Pugsley Addams
All Saints Street, Abu

Video Games
Captain Tsubasa: Rise of New Champions, Ismael Senghor
Elsword, Noah Ebalon
Fire Emblem: Three Houses, Linhardt von Hevring
Genshin Impact, Aether
The Legend of Heroes: Kuro no Kiseki II – Crimson Sin, Ixs

References

External links
 Official agency profile 
 

1993 births
Living people
Japanese male pop singers
Japanese male video game actors
Japanese male voice actors
Male voice actors from Osaka Prefecture
Musicians from Osaka Prefecture
21st-century Japanese male actors
21st-century Japanese singers
21st-century Japanese male singers